The 1981-82 French Rugby Union Championship was won by Agen, beating Bayonne in the final.

The group B was won by Avenir Aturin (from Aire-sur-Adour)  beating Bourgoin in the final.

Formula 

For the third  time, the clubs of the "Group B" didn't participate for the title, but played a proper championship.

In both group the two better of each pool were admitted directly to "last 16" round of knockout stage, while the classified from 3rd to 6th of each pool were admitted to a barrage.

Group A

Qualification round 

The teams are listed as the ranking, in bold the teams admitted directly to "last 16" round.

Barrage 
In bold the clubs qualified for the next round

"Last 16" 
In bold the clubs qualified for the next round. For the first time  was played with home/away basis.

Remark that the clubs coming from barrage was all eliminated.

Quarter of finals 
In bold the clubs qualified for the next round. (Single match knockout)

Semifinals

Final 

Agen won the 7th Bouclier de Brennus, after the last victory in 1976.

Group B

External links
 Compte rendu finale de 1982 lnr.fr

1982
France
Championship